L'imparfait des Langues is the twelfth album by the French jazz musician Louis Sclavis, and his fifth for ECM Records.

Background 
Sclavis had received a commission to premiere a new project at the Monaco Festival Le Printemps des Arts in Monte Carlo, in April 2005. Having put together an ensemble, Sclavis sketched the compositions for L'imparfait des langues in ten days. The concert was cancelled at short notice due to the death of Monaco's Prince Rainier. Without a venue, Sclavis and his group booked into a recording studio in Pernes-les-Fontaines and recorded the music in a single day.

Music 
Sclavis was keen to challenge his compositional habits and brought together an ensemble with which he had had little previous experience. The players were not "pure jazz", but worked in many different styles of music. Structurally, many of the pieces are based on short 8 or 16-bar phrases and equal emphasis is placed on texture and sound as well as melody. The album has a wide textural diversity, from the "aggressive improvisation" of "L'idée du dialecte" and the Sonic Youth-style overdriven guitar of Maxime Delpierre's "Convocation" to the heavily processed vocals of "Annonce" and the repetitive "Le verbe".

Track listing 
All compositions by Louis Sclavis, except "Premier imparfait «a»" and "Premier imparfait «b»" by Louis Sclavis and Paul Brousseau and "Convocation" by Maxime Delpierre.
 "Premier imparfait «a»" – 1:46
 "L'idée du dialecte" – 6:57
 "Premier imparfait «b»" – 1:01
 "Le verbe" – 6:42
 "Dialogue with a dream" – 3:59
 "Annonce" – 1:40
 "Archéologie" – 6:12
 "Deuxieme imparfait" – 2:16
 "Convocation" – 1:16
 "Palabre" – 4:00
 "Le longs du temps" – 5:30
 "L'écrit sacrifié" – 2:25
 "Story of a phrase" – 7:32
 "L'imparfait des langues" – 3:57

Personnel 
Louis Sclavis – clarinet, bass clarinet, soprano saxophone
Marc Baron – alto saxophone
Paul Brousseau – keyboards, sampling, electronics, guitar
Maxime Delpierre – guitar
François Merville – drums

References

External links 
 L'imparfait des Langues at ECM Records
 L'imparfait des Langues at All About Jazz

2007 albums
Albums produced by Manfred Eicher
ECM Records albums
Louis Sclavis albums